Aileen Wuornos: The Selling of a Serial Killer is a 1992 documentary film about Aileen Wuornos, made by Nick Broomfield. It documents Broomfield's attempts to interview Wuornos, which involves a long process of mediation through her adoptive mother, Arlene Pralle, and her lawyer, Steve Glazer.

The film essentially highlights the exploitation of Wuornos by those around her and questions the fairness of her trial, given the vested interests of the police.

The film was used by the defense in the Wuornos trial in 2001 to highlight the incompetence of Wuornos' original lawyer. It was through this process that Broomfield decided to make a second film, Aileen: Life and Death of a Serial Killer.

For the feature film Monster, Charlize Theron used this film as source material, apparently watching clips in-between takes in order to perfect her character. For her performance, Theron won a Best Actress Oscar, awarded on what would have been Wuornos's birthday.

Synopsis

Cast 
 Aileen Wuornos as herself
 Nick Broomfield as himself – Interviewer
 Jesse Aviles as himself (Jesse "The Human Bomb" Aviles)
 Cannonball as himself
 Steve Glazer as himself
 Sgt. Brian Jarvis as himself
 Michael McCarthy as himself
 Dick Mills as himself
 Arlene Pralle as herself
 Mike Reynolds as himself

Awards 
 1993 – Nominated for the Grand Jury Prize for Documentary at the Sundance Film Festival

References

External links 
 
 Official Nick Broomfield website
 Nick Broomfield on meeting Aileen Wuornos (Video interview from Capturing Reality: The Art of Documentary)

1992 films
1992 documentary films
1990s English-language films
1990s American films
American documentary films
American LGBT-related films
Documentary films about serial killers
Documentary films about women
Documentary films about prostitution in the United States
Documentary films about lesbians
Documentary films about post-traumatic stress disorder
Documentary films about violence against women
Films directed by Nick Broomfield
Films about Aileen Wuornos
Films set in Florida